The greenface sandsifter (Lethrinops furcifer) is a species of cichlid endemic to Lake Malawi where it prefers areas with sandy substrates.  This species grows to a length of  TL.  It can also be found in the aquarium trade.

References

Greenface sandsifter
Taxa named by Ethelwynn Trewavas
Fish described in 1931
Taxonomy articles created by Polbot